Tenth Fleet or 10th fleet may refer to:

 United States Tenth Fleet
 10th Area Fleet (Imperial Japanese Navy)
 10th Air Fleet (Imperial Japanese Navy)

See also

 
 
 
 
 Tenth (disambiguation)
 Fleet (disambiguation)
 Ninth Fleet (disambiguation)
 Eleventh Fleet (disambiguation)